Ryan Lucas may refer to:

 Ryan Lucas (Canadian football) (born 1984), Canadian football defensive tackle
 Ryan Lucas (Barbadian footballer) (born 1977), footballer who played in North America and for the Barbados national football team